"This Is Radio Clash" is a song by the English punk rock band the Clash. It was released as a single in 1981 on various formats. The song was performed months before its release, beginning with the Impossible Mission Tour of April and May 1981. A live performance was televised on Tom Snyder's Tomorrow show on 5 June 1981. 

The song received mixed reviews from critics, who were hoping The Clash would return to its anarchic punk roots. Despite the mixed reviews, the song received some praise for its experimental nature and the Clash's signature anti-authoritarian political lyrics. As well as the previous Clash single (The Magnificent Seven), "This is Radio Clash" also continued the Clash's genre experiments with Rap rock and funk, which had broken through the American markets.

Release

7-inch single
The 7-inch single also contains a B-side titled simply "Radio Clash", which is a remix of the title track with additional lyrics. The Clash stated at the time that they intended the songs to be heard as a single entity. The two recordings have the same playing time.

"This Is Radio Clash" begins with the lyric:

 "This is Radio Clash on pirate satelliteOrbiting your living room, cashing in the bill of rights."

"Radio Clash" begins with:

<blockquote>"This is Radio Clash resuming all transmissionsBeaming from the mountain tops, using aural ammunition."</blockquote>

On some versions of the Super Black Market Clash CD, the B-side "Radio Clash" is included, but incorrectly listed as "This Is Radio Clash". The same error was repeated on the US version of the 2003 collection The Essential Clash.

12-inch single
On side one of the 12-inch single, "This Is Radio Clash" is followed by "Radio Clash". Side two contains two additional remixes of the title track: "Outside Broadcast" and "Radio Five". In 2006, a CD compilation called Singles Box was released which collected all four versions in the same order with original cover art.

Legacy
American critic Eric Schafer described the song as "a magnificent, daring, challenging record that was years ahead of its time; one of the great rock records of the 1980s, it has never been given its just credit. Twenty-eight years after its debut, were it released today it would still burn up the radio."

The song is not featured on any of the Clash's original studio albums, but is included on their compilations The Story of the Clash, Volume 1 (1988), Clash on Broadway (1991), The Singles (1991),  Sound System (2013), Singles Box (2006) and The Singles (2007). The song is included on the experimental compilation album called Disco Not Disco 2 (2002), as well as the radio soundtrack in the video game Battlefield Hardline (2015). The song was also briefly featured in season 2, episode 4 of Stranger Things''.

Track listing
All tracks written and composed by The Clash (Joe Strummer, Mick Jones, Paul Simonon, Topper Headon).

7" vinyl
 "This Is Radio Clash" – 4:12
 "Radio Clash" – 4:12

12" vinyl / Cassette 
 "This Is Radio Clash" – 4:12
 "Radio Clash" – 4:12
 "Outside Broadcast" – 7:23
 "Radio 5" – 3:38

Personnel
The Clash
Joe Strummer – vocal, rhythm guitar
Mick Jones – vocal, lead guitar
Paul Simonon – bass guitar
Topper Headon – drums

Additional musician
Gary Barnacle – saxophones

Charts

Notes

References

External links

 This Is Radio Clash at MySpace (streamed copy where licensed)

 Radio Clash at MySpace (streamed copy where licensed)

1981 singles
The Clash songs
Songs about radio
Songs written by Paul Simonon
Songs written by Joe Strummer
Songs written by Mick Jones (The Clash)
1981 songs
CBS Records singles
Rap rock songs